Aliyans is an Indian Malayalam-language sitcom directed by Rajesh Thalachira. It premiered on Kaumudy TV on 24 February 2020. It is the sequel to Aliyan vs Aliyan.

Plot summary 
Set in Trivandrum, the story revolves around the life of Ratnamma and her family highlighting the daily incidents and the love-hate relationship between the two brother in-laws, Kanakan and Cleatus.

Cast

Main cast 
 Aneesh Ravi as Kanakan Muthuraman
 Riyas Narmakala as Cleatus Mathai
 Soumya Bhagyan Pillai as Lilly
 Manju Pathrose as Thankam
 Sethu Lakshmi as Ratnamma
 Akshaya as Muthu

Recurring cast 
 Mani Shornur as Girirajan/Ammavan
 Bindhu Sreehari as Girija Ammayi
 Abhi Kottarakkara as Ronald
 Maya Suresh as Kunjammachi
 Smitha S Anil as Sulu Chechi
 Arun Sreekantan as Indu/Indran
 Greeshma Ramesh as Parvathy
 Binoj Kulathoor as Ambilikkuttan
 Rithu Nilaa as Nallu
 Anzar Babu as Ansar
 Salil S Nair as Natarajan
 Ramesh Kottayam as Pappa

Guest cast
Anumol as Bhama (Episode 85)
Naveen Arakkal as Biju (Episode 85)
Sheela as Herself (Episode 100: Special Wishes)
Baby & Mary as Kudumbasree members (Episode 140)
Shyam Mohan as Jayan (Episode 147)
Akhil as Vallabhan  (Episode 253)
Uma Nair as Pavithra Unnikrishnan (Episode 264)

Awards

References 

Indian television sitcoms
Indian television soap operas
Serial drama television series
2020 Indian television series debuts
Malayalam-language television shows
Indian drama television series